Platygonus ("flat head" in reference to the straight shape of the forehead) is an extinct genus of herbivorous peccaries of the family Tayassuidae, endemic to North and South America from the Miocene through Pleistocene epochs (10.3 million to 11,000 years ago), existing for about .

Description 
They also had a pig-like snout and long tusks which were probably used to fend off predators.

Taxonomy 
While long thought to be the sister-lineage to the Chacoan peccary based on morphological similarities, a 2017 ancient DNA study which recovered mitochondrial DNA from Platygonus found that all living peccaries are more closely related to each other than they are to Platygonus. The estimated divergence between Platygonus and all living peccaries was placed in the Miocene, around 22 million years ago.

Ecology 
Like modern peccaries, Platygonus is thought to have lived in herds. Their remains are particularly abundant in caves, suggesting that they regularly used them. A study on the population structure of a population of P. compressus from Bat Cave, Missouri found that they had a similar demographic structure to modern peccaries, dominated by young adults, with a progressive attenuation of older adults due to predation and old-age, up to a maximum age of around 10 years. Platygonus is though to have consumed tough foliage like leaves and grass.

Distribution 
During the Late Pleistocene, Platygonus was most common in Eastern North America, with records in the Great Plains and western North America being more sparse. In South America, Platygonus ranged from Colombia to Argentina.

Taxonomy 

Platygonus was named by John Lawrence LeConte in 1848 for fossils found in Pleistocene karst deposits in Illinois, which are now preserved in the Academy of National Sciences in Philadelphia.

The following species of Platygonus have been described:

 P. bicalcaratus (nomen dubium)
 P. brachirostris
 P. chapadmalensis
 P. cinctus
 P. compressus (type)
 P. kraglievichi
 P. marplatensis
 P. narinoensis
 P. oregonensis
 P. pearcei
 P. pollenae
 P. scagliae
 P. setiger
 P. striatus
 P. texanus 
 P. vetus

Distribution 
Fossils of Platygonus have been found in:

Miocene
 Sheep Creek Formation, Nebraska

Chapadmalalan
 Chapadmalal Formation, Argentina

Hemphillian
 Beecher Island, Colorado
 Edson Beds, Kansas
 Rancho Viejo Beds, Mexico
 Devil's Nest Airstrip, Ogallala Group, Nebraska
 McKay and Rattlesnake Formations, Oregon
 Miami Quarry, Texas

Blancan
 Gila Conglomerate and St. David Formation, Arizona
 Palm Spring and San Diego Formations, California
 Tamiami Formation, Florida
 Glenns Ferry Formations, Idaho
 Ballard, Rexroad and Crooked Creek Formations, Kansas
 Rancho Viejo Beds, Mexico
 Tequixquiac, Mexico
 Panaca Formation, Nevada
 Camp Rice Formation, New Mexico
 Blanco and Love Formations, Texas
 Ringold Formation, Washington

Plio-Pleistocene
 Cocha Verde, Taminango, Colombia

Pleistocene
 Tarija Formation, Bolivia
 Palm Spring and Turlock Lake Formations, California
 Bermont and Wicomico Formations, Florida
 Yarbrough Cave, Georgia
 American Falls Lake Bed E Formation, Idaho
 Galena, Illinois (type locality)
 Harrodsburg Crevice, Indiana
 Turin Pit, Iowa
 Kingsdown and Crooked Creek Formations, Kansas
 Welch Cave, Kentucky
 Cumberland Bone Cave and Bushey Cavern, Maryland
 Tacubaya Formation, Mexico
 Geddes Lake barrow pit, Michigan
 Little Beaver Cave, Jacob's Cave, and Zoo Cave, Missouri
 Sappa Formation, Nebraska
 Dry Cave, New Mexico
 Sheriden Cave, Ohio
 Holloman Gravel Pit, Oklahoma
 Fossil Lake, Oregon
 Hanover Quarry and Platygonus vetus type locality, Pennsylvania
 Hot Springs Mammoth Site, South Dakota
 Laubach Cave, Seymour, Tule and Shuler Formations, Texas
 Early's Cave, Gardner's Cave, New Quarry Cave, Vickers Cave, Ruffners Cave, Virginia
 Hamilton Cave, Trout Cave, Poorfarm Cave, Patton Cave, West Virginia
 Wellsch Valley, Saskatchewan
Old Crow Flats, Yukon

References

Bibliography

Further reading 
 

†Platygonus
Miocene even-toed ungulates
Pliocene even-toed ungulates
Pleistocene even-toed ungulates
Miocene first appearances
Pleistocene genus extinctions
Neogene mammals of North America
Pleistocene mammals of North America
Irvingtonian
Blancan
Hemphillian
Pleistocene Canada
Fossils of Canada
Neogene Mexico
Pleistocene Mexico
Fossils of Mexico
Miocene United States
Pliocene United States
Pleistocene United States
Fossils of the United States
Pliocene mammals of South America
Pleistocene mammals of South America
Ensenadan
Uquian
Chapadmalalan
Neogene Argentina
Pleistocene Argentina
Fossils of Argentina
Pleistocene Bolivia
Fossils of Bolivia
Neogene Colombia
Pleistocene Colombia
Fossils of Colombia
Fossil taxa described in 1848
Ringold Formation Miocene Fauna
Prehistoric even-toed ungulate genera